Norm Charles (1 August 1931 – 25 November 2017) was  a former Australian rules footballer who played with Footscray in the Victorian Football League (VFL).

Notes

External links 		
		
		

		
2017 deaths		
1931 births		
Australian rules footballers from Victoria (Australia)		
Western Bulldogs players